Hotel Post was a service offered by remote Swiss hotels for the carriage of mail to the nearest official post office.

Origins 

In the nineteenth century, Switzerland developed an important tourist industry. Some hotels in remote areas that were not serviced by the Swiss Post Office offered a service to guests of carrying their mail to the nearest official post office for a fee paid by the purchase of a specially printed stamp. The first hotel stamp was issued by Rigi Kaltbad in 1864, followed by hotels at Rigi Scheideck, Belalp, Kurort Stoos, Maderanerthal and Rigi Kulm.

Last usage in Switzerland 

These services became unnecessary as the Swiss railway was extended and a normal postal service introduced. After 20 September 1883, all remaining services were prohibited by the Swiss government.

Use in other countries 

Hotels in several other countries have issued stamps including in Austria, Hungary, Egypt (Shepheard's Hotel, Cairo), Japan (The Imperial Hotel, Tokyo), Romania and Singapore (Raffles Hotel). In Hungary stamps were issued at Carpathian resorts for Kurhaus auf der Hohen Rinne between 1895 and 1926, Magura in 1903 and 1911, and Bistra in 1909 to 1912. These resorts were part of Rumania after World War One. In Austria stamps were issued for Kesselfall-Alpenhaus and Moserboden between 1927 and 1938 and Katschberghohe in 1933-38. Stamps were also issued at a hotel in the Kulmi Mountain region of Liechtenstein.

Classification 

Hotel stamps are regarded as local or cinderella stamps.

References

Further reading

Switzerland
 Kottelat, Marcel. Studie über die schweizerische Hotelpost 1864-1900. Bern: Zumstein & Cie/Inhaber Hertsch & Co., 1995. 
 Leemann, Hans. Die schweizerische Hotelpost. Basel: Sandoz A.G., 1960. Also published in French and English.
 Leutwyler, Hans. Die schweizerische Hotelpost und der Hôtel-Telegraphen- und Telephondienst im 19. Jahrhundert. Bern: H. Leutwyler, 1962.

Hungary and Romania
 Dragoteanu, Mircea. Hotel Posts of Transylvania. Cluj-Napoca: The Author, 2010 398p.
 Dragoteanu, Mircea. Istoria postelor locale transilvane: Paltinis (Hohe Rinne), Bistra, Magura. Cluj-Napoca: The Author, 1998 , 192p.
 Ettre, Leslie S. Hotel Post of the Siebenburgischer Karpathenverein Hohe Rinne and Bistra. Norwalk, CT: Society for Hungarian Philately, 1977, 32p.
 Williams, L.N. and M. Hotel posts of Hungary & Roumania: being a handbook & catalogue of the private local stamps of Hohe Rinne, Magura, and Bistra. London: L.N. Williams, 1962.

External links 
 Image of a stamp issued by the Hotel du Mont Prosa, St. Gotthard.
 Further examples of Swiss Hotel Post stamps
 United States Hotel Sherman poster stamps.
 Hotel Posts of Transylvania: Doctoral Thesis

Philatelic terminology
Cinderella stamps
Philately of Switzerland